Theodore George Karras Sr. (January 31, 1934 – January 26, 2016) was a National Football League (NFL) player.  He played for nine seasons with four teams, winning a championship with the Chicago Bears in 1963 as a guard.  Karras played college football for Indiana University. His son, Ted Karras Jr., played college football for Northwestern University and in the NFL for the Washington Redskins in 1987 and is currently the head football coach at Walsh University. His brothers, Lou Karras and Alex Karras, also played in the NFL. His grandson, Ted Karras III, played college football at the University of Illinois at Urbana–Champaign, played for the New England Patriots winning two Super Bowls and now plays for the Cincinnati Bengals.

References

1934 births
2016 deaths
American football defensive tackles
Indiana Hoosiers football players
Pittsburgh Steelers players
Chicago Bears players
Detroit Lions players
Los Angeles Rams players
Players of American football from Gary, Indiana
American people of Greek descent
Karras football family